Stan Bulpit (4 September 1926 – 19 April 2006) was an  Australian rules footballer who played with South Melbourne in the Victorian Football League (VFL).

Notes

External links 

1926 births
2006 deaths
Australian rules footballers from Victoria (Australia)
Sydney Swans players